Svetozar "Sveta" Stojanović (Serbian Cyrillic: Светозар Стојановић) (18 October 1931 – 7 May 2010) was a Serbian philosopher and political theorist.

Biography
Stojanović was an intellectual in the European tradition, an academic who contributed to philosophical theory and engaged in practical politics. He bridged the divide between the more grand and speculative Continental philosophy and analytic Anglo-American ethical theory. His doctoral dissertation on Contemporary Meta-ethics was grounded on his study of ordinary language analysis at the University of Oxford and later he met weekly at the University of Michigan to discuss ethical issues with William Frankena, Richard Brandt and Charles Stevenson. But the focus of his important contributions to philosophy was always critical Marxism, Marxism creatively interpreted as a critique of social institutions destructive of humanistic values. He is best known for his rejection of the dictatorship of the proletariat and advocacy of a democratic socialism.

Svetozar Stojanović was born in 1931 in Kragujevac, Kingdom of Yugoslavia (present day Serbia) and received a PhD in philosophy from the University of Belgrade in 1962.  Together with seven other professors and teachers, called The Praxis Group, he was expelled from the University of Belgrade in January 1975 for dissident activities during Josip Broz Tito's regime in Yugoslavia.  He returned to the University in the early nineties as socialist Yugoslavia was falling apart. In 1992 and 1993 he served as a special adviser to former Yugoslav President Dobrica Ćosić.

Stojanović was a longtime critic of Slobodan Milošević, and one of the protagonists in the October 2000 Serbian democratic revolution which culminated in the overthrow of Milošević. He was appointed to the Commission for Truth and Reconciliation by former Yugoslav President Vojislav Koštunica, and later became a member of the Council for Foreign Relations of the Ministry of Foreign Affairs of Serbia.

Stojanovic was a member of the Council for Secular Humanism's International Academy of Humanism, a member of the Paris International Institute of Philosophy (Institut International de Philosophie) and the Academy of Humanistic Studies in Moscow. In 1973 he was one of the signers of the Humanist Manifesto II. He was co-chairman of the International Humanist and Ethical Union, 1985-87.  He was a long-time director of the Institute for Philosophy and Social Theory in Belgrade and the member of the governing board of Korčula Summer School.  Stojanović was a visiting professor at many prominent universities in the United States, Germany, Great Britain, Austria, and India.

With Djuro Kovacevic, another Serbian political theorist, Stojanović was a co-founder and president of the Serbian-American Center in Belgrade, which developed into the Center for National Strategy, and the Forum for Serbian-American Dialogue and Cooperation.

He was the chief editor of Praxis International from 1987–1990 and, most recently, a member of the editorial council of Philosophy & Social Criticism, based in Boston.

Stojanović authored seven books, four brochures, and 130 journal articles.  His works have been translated into fourteen languages, including English, German, French, Russian, Spanish, and Japanese.  Books in English include: Between Ideals and Reality: A Critique of Socialism and Its Future, Oxford University Press, 1973; In Search of Democracy in Socialism, Prometheus Books, Buffalo, NY, 1981; From Marxism and Bolshevism to Gorbachev, Prometheus Books, 1988; The Fall of Yugoslavia: Why Communism Failed, Prometheus  Books, 1997; and Serbia: The Democratic Revolution, Humanity Books, Buffalo, NY, 2003.

Selected works
Stojanovic S. (1973) Between Ideals and Reality: A Critique of Socialism and its Future. Oxford University Press
Stojanovic S. (1981) In Search of Democracy in Socialism: History and Party Consciousness. Buffalo, NY: Prometheus Books
Stojanovic S. (1988) Perestoika: from Marxism and Bolshevism to Gorbachev. Buffalo, NY: Prometheus Books
Stojanovic S. (1997) The Fall of Yugoslavia: Why Communism Failed. Buffalo, NY: Prometheus Books
Stojanovic S. (2003) Serbia: The Democratic Revolution. Buffalo, NY: Humanity Books

References

External links
 A profile in The Transnational Foundation for Peace and Future Research 
 An article and profile in [The Guardian] 
 Serbia: The Democratic Revolution reviewed in [Foreign Affairs] 
 A 1971 article in [The New York Review of Books] 
 A 2010 Essay/Documentary from RTS - Serbian TV [RTS - Pravo na Budućnost] 

20th-century Serbian philosophers
Serbian political philosophers
Academic staff of the University of Belgrade
University of Belgrade Faculty of Philosophy alumni
1931 births
2010 deaths